Husiatyn is an urban-type settlement in Chortkiv Raion, Ternopil Oblast (province) in western Ukraine. Alternate spellings include Gusyatin, Husyatin, and Hsiatyn. It hosts the administration of Husiatyn settlement hromada, one of the hromadas of Ukraine. Husiatyn is located on the west bank of the Zbruch River, which once formed the old boundary between Austria-Hungary and the Russian Empire in the 19th century, and the boundary between the Republic of Poland and the Soviet Union during the 1920s and 1930s.

History
Husiatyn was first recorded in 1559, when it was part of the Polish–Lithuanian Commonwealth and the year it was granted self-government under the Magdeburg Law. At this time it was located in the province of Podolia. It came under Austrian rule in 1772 with other parts of Southern Podolia (the region between the Zbruch and the Seret rivers) and was attached to the Austrian crownland of Galicia and Lodomeria. The Emperor Joseph II toured this area immediately after its annexation to Austria and was very impressed by the fertility of the soil and its future prospects. It remained a county centre under Austrian rule until the collapse of Austria-Hungary and the declaration of the Western Ukrainian People's Republic in 1918. In 1919, the Ukrainian Galician Army fought the Bolsheviks there but was driven out by the Poles, who absorbed the area into the Second Polish Republic. 

In 1939 Husiatyn was annexed to the Ukrainian Soviet Socialist Republic. Husiatyn was occupied by Nazi troops on July 6, 1941. As soon as they arrived, approximately 200 Jews were sent to the labor camps or were killed immediately by the Germans and the Ukrainian police. In March 1942, the remaining Jews were transported to concentration camps in Kopychyntsi, Probizhna and Belzec.

The 19th century rural population of Husiatyn County was predominantly Ukrainian and the town predominantly Jewish. There was also a small Polish landowning stratum. In the late 19th century and the beginning of the 20th century, Southern Podolia, including Husiatyn County, witnessed large-scale out-migration of its peasant population to western Canada.

Husiatyn served as the administrative center of Husiatyn Raion, until reform of Ukraine, which reduced the number of raions in Ternopil Oblast to three in18 July 2020m and the area of Husiatyn Raion was merged into Chortkiv Raion.

Husiatyn and Hasidism

Husiatyn, which was home to a large Jewish population prior to the Holocaust, was once  the base for a significant Hasidic group of the Husiatyner dynasty and their Rebbes. Four generations of the dynasty lived in Husiatyn: Shraga Feivish Friedman, (1835-1894) 1st Rebbe of Husiatyn; Yisroel Friedman, (1858-1949) 2nd Rebbe of Husiatyn, Yaakov Friedman, (1878-1957) 3rd Rebbe of Husiatyn, and Yitzchok Friedman, (1900-1968) 4th and last Rebbe of Husiatyn. The Husiatyn Synagogue, a rare example of a Fortress synagogue, was restored as a museum.

Monuments

Architectural monuments in the town of Husiatyn include the ruins of a  17th century castle, a 16th century church, a 17th century town hall, a Renaissance style synagogue, and a 16th century Bernardine monastery and church.

A Neolithic grave, complete with a coffin,  was discovered some time before 1928 in the village of Chornokintsi Velyki (Czarnokońce Wielkie in Polish)..

References

Notes

Sources
 Paulus Adelsgruber, L. Cohen, B. Kuzmany, Getrennt und Doch Verbunden: Grenzstädte Zwischen Osterreich und Russland 1772 - 1918 (Böhlau, Vienna/Cologne/Weimar 2011).
 Stella Hryniuk, Peasants With Promise: Ukrainians in Southeastern Galicia (Edmonton, 1991). On the endpapers of this book, there is a map showing all of the villages of the five counties of Southern Podolia, including Husiatyn County.
 Przewodnik po Województwie Tarnopolskiem z mapą [Guide to the Ternopil Region with a Map] (Ternopil, 1928; reprinted circa, 1990). Contains much historical material.

External links
Husiatyń at the Polish Genealogical Society of California

Urban-type settlements in Chortkiv Raion
Podolia Voivodeship
Kingdom of Galicia and Lodomeria
Tarnopol Voivodeship
Jewish Galician (Eastern Europe) history
Jewish Ukrainian history
Shtetls
Holocaust locations in Ukraine
Zbruch